The Honda Ballade is a subcompact automobile built by Honda of Japan. It began as a four-door higher equipment content version of the Civic in 1980. The Ballade was developed at the same time the Honda Vigor appeared, which was a higher content Honda Accord. In Japan, the Ballade was sold exclusively at Honda Verno dealerships alongside the Vigor, Prelude, CR-X, and Quint. In the UK it was launched at the same time as the very similar Triumph Acclaim with which it shared a Honda-built engine.

History

The name of the car was taken from "ballade", the French word for a ballad. Because both the four-door Ballade sedan and the five-door hatchback Quintet were both high luxury content vehicles derived from the Honda Civic, the Ballade represented a type of music, and the Quintet represented a musical group. The Ballade competed in Japan with the Toyota Sprinter, and the Nissan Laurel Spirit as the Civic competed with the Corolla, and the Sunny.

It was launched in September 1980, nine months after the agreement between Honda and British Leyland to produce their own versions of the car and work on future cars together. Although the original Ballade was never sold in Europe, British Leyland produced its own version of the Ballade - the Triumph Acclaim - from 1981 to 1984. In North America the Ballade nameplate was never used, the model instead being sold as the Civic Sedan.

After 1984, the Ballade shared most of its body panels with the Civic, except for a sportier front end, and formed the basis of the CR-X sports car and the original Rover 200. Of this second generation Ballade the top model - EX-i - featured a 1.5L naturally aspirated 12-valve all-aluminium engine with multi-point fuel injection (using Honda's PGM-FI system) developing , the same engine was used on the first generation Civic CRX. Other features of the EX-i included electric windows all-round, electric and heated wing mirrors, metallic paint, vented front disc brakes and hydraulic power-assisted steering. Lower specification models featured the same 1.5L engine but with fueling provided via a carburetor, producing . In keeping with the styling trend shared with other Honda Verno products, the second generation car adopted partially concealed headlights starting in 1983, shared with the Vigor, Quint Integra, Ballade Sports CR-X, and the Prelude.

The Ballade in Japan was replaced in September 1987, with the Honda Concerto 5-door hatchback and sedan as the luxury Civic offering at newly established Honda Clio dealerships in Japan. As the Ballade was essentially a luxury version of the Civic sedan, Honda repositioned the Ballade from Honda Verno, first with the Concerto name, then renamed again as the Honda Domani at Honda Clio, and introduced it with the Honda Accord, the Honda Inspire, and the Honda Legend in 1992, with the Civic now headlining at Honda Primo stores. The sport-oriented version of the Civic loosely held by the Ballade evolved into the Honda Integra, and assumed the market position originally held by the Ballade at Honda Verno dealership locations.

In South Africa, the name plate was revived in 2011 for the Honda City sold in other markets.

South Africa

1980-1983
1300cc Twin carb, 5-speed manual or 3-speed automatic
E-series engine

1984-1987
Known in South Africa as the SC9, or informally as the "popup" as to not confuse it with the SH4. This particular model had motorised eyelids which popped up when the main headlights were switched on.

Engines included 1.3-liter 12-valve EV, 1.5-liter 12-valve EW, 1.5-liter 12-valve PGMFI EW and ZC (first gen) D-series.

1988-1991
Also known as the Honda Civic series EF (internationally), the Civic Sedan, or the Ballade series SH4 (South Africa).
Known on the streets of South Africa as "DOHC"  as not to confuse it with the SC9 or SR4

Engines includes:
D15B3
D16A7
D16A9

D-series engines

1992-1995

South African chassis code SR4

Engines:
D15B3 - 69 kW
D16A7 - 86 kW
D16A9 - 96 kW
B18B3 - 97 kW

1996-2000
In 1996 the Ballade and Civic got a facelift with a total of 12 changes. Honda & Colt(Mitsubishi) Division of Mercedes-Benz of South Africa marketing manager Guy Franken says: "With a total 12 derivatives in the range we believe that we have the entire small/intermediate car market covered and offer value in performance, specification, safety and affordability."

These changes include:
 A beverage holder
 The velour colour of the bolsters in the Luxline has been changed to a more modern blue/grey.
 A more pronounced grooved styling line in the bonnet.
 A larger H-emblem on the grille.
 Redesigned bumpers with no inserts.
 A Becker A7 radio/tape was fitted in all Luxline models.
 An anti-shock gearbox on the Ballade 180i Luxline Automatic.
 Lightweight alloy wheels on the 180i and VTEC models and full wheel covers on the others.

There was also an AMG (Mercedes Benz) version sold at AMG dealers since AMG Managed the racing team. It had some small modifications that allowed it to produce 129kW in B16A6 format. A Sport trim was also available, it added Sport badges, an aluminum gear knob like the DC2 Type R and subtle suspension tuning.

The engines available:
D15Z4
D16Y9
B18B4 118 kW
B16A6

D-series engines and B-series engines

Ballade (South Africa) reintroduction 

The Ballade name continued to be used for a Civic-based model in South Africa, where it was used instead of Civic on locally produced versions until 2001. South African Ballades were assembled by the local subsidiary of Daimler-Benz, which wanted to market a smaller and cheaper car in addition to its Mercedes-Benz models. The Ballade name was adopted because it was perceived to have more luxury and upmarket connotations than the Civic name. This was important because the Ballade was sold through the Mercedes-Benz dealership channel.

Since March 2011, the City is sold as the Ballade in South Africa.

References

External links 

 

Ballade
Cars introduced in 1980
Compact cars
Front-wheel-drive vehicles